Karagounides (singular: Καραγκούνης, Karagounis) are an ethnic Greek subgroup and are the native people of the western plains of Thessaly, Greece. More specifically, the term is used to refer to the inhabitants of the lowland farming communities of the Karditsa and Trikala regions, and the area around the city of Farsala. 

Thessaly
Ethnic groups in Greece